Benin is a weaker side in the Africa Cup of Nations, and only managed four appearances in the tournament. Benin first appeared in 2004, before qualified again in 2008, 2010 and 2019. While Benin has not been unable to join the top two highest ranked team in AFCON history, nor even win a single match in the competition, Benin managed its best performance in the tournament, during the 2019 AFCON when Benin came to quarter-finals, including a shock win over Morocco after penalty shootout. This means Benin is the first team to reach the quarter-finals of AFCON without ever winning a single competitive match in their participation history.

List of performances

Squads

Participation history

2004 Tunisia

Group stage

2008 Ghana

Group stage

2010 Angola

Group stage

2019 Egypt

Group stage

Round of sixteen

Quarter-finals

References

External links
Africa Cup of Nations - Archives competitions - cafonline.com

 
Benin national football team